AIR 107.2 is the community radio station for Weymouth and Portland. All content is broadcast from its studios in Weymouth via its transmitter located at Wyke Regis.

AIR stands for All Inclusive Radio. AIR began its life as a student radio station, streaming online and to Westfield Arts College.It soon grew and pulled together students from across the locale to jointly broadcast on AIR. Students work towards nationally recognised accreditations whilst having the opportunity to gain real media experience.

AIR 107.2 is also responsible for hosting the annual event "Party in the Park", which is hosted on the first weekend in August at Lodmoor Country Park.

History

2011
AIR began streaming via its website on Wednesday 11 May 2011. The station was endorsed by many celebrities including Chris Evans, Jonathan Ross, Lorraine Kelly, Carol Vorderman, Chris Jarvis and many more.
The station was officially opened by BBC Radio 1 veteran, Ed Stewart.
On the launch day of AIR - Student Radio, 200 helium filled balloons were released into the air and a live celebratory concert was held on the field of Westfield Arts College.
Many local dignitaries and media representatives attended the launch including; Dorset Echo, BBC Radio Solent, BBC Spotlight, Weymouth View and students from various schools across Dorset.

2012
In April, AIR was awarded FM status by Ofcom. In July the radio station was invited to the Houses of Commons as finalists in the Arqiva Schools Radio Station of the Year Awards. AIR received an Arqiva Special Commendation Award.
AIR held a further live event, hAIRaiser, at Weymouth Pavilion on 31 October. A third live event was hosted at the Dorchester Corn Exchange involving performances by local artists all of whom performed to raise money for AIR.

2020
The station underwent some major programming changes, despite the pandemic. Notable local presenters Brad Butterworth, Steve Carptenter and James O'Neill all started new morning shows on the station. In June 2020 Brad started a new weekday breakfast show, in August 2020 Steve started a new weekday mid-morning show and in December 2020 James started a new Saturday morning breakfast show. Further changes were also made to the afternoons on the stations schedule.

In August 2020, Robson James was appointed as the Managing Director for AIR FM CIC from a previous directors role.

2021
In January 2021, Brad Butterworth was appointed Programming Director for AIR FM CIC after previously being appointed the Programme Controller.

In February 2021, AIR 107.2 and Radio Ninesprings began joint-broadcasting the Somerset and Dorset Quiz every Tuesday night between 8-10PM. The quiz was aimed at boosting moral in the 3rd national lockdown in England, by getting as many households in the two broadcast areas to play along and interact. Notable presenters/producers include Brad Butterworth, Robson James and Steve Carpenter.

2022

In January 2022 two more directors were appointed, James O'Neill and Richard Talmage. In February 2022 AIR was awarded a power increase on the transmitter at Wyke Regis by Ofcom, quadrupling the output from 25 watts to 100 watts. In May 2022 both Robson James and Brad Butterworth stepped down from their positions as directors, with Robson continuing to be part of Air with his Monday evening show 'Monday Evening's With Robson' from 8pm and also in his technical role. This leaves three directors of Air FM CIC, Ben Tolley (Technical), Richard Talmage (Financial/Engineering) and James O'Neill (Programming). 

2023

2023 saw the start of more volunteer recruitment, with the newest presenter Oscar Brown to begin his show with 2000's and 2010's anthems from 8pm on Wednesdays, commencing 1st February 2023. AIR FM CIC is also actively involved with upcoming events, and has been chosen to host the main music stage on the beach for Weymouth Carnival 2024 

Air 107.2 has been granted another 5 year extension to its licence up until 9th May 2028

The current position
In 2012 AIR received official FM Community Radio Status from OFCOM.

Transmitter
Transmission of AIR 107.2 comes from the Arqiva Wyke Regis site. Transmission was increased on 23rd February 2022 from 25W to 100W omni at 28m.

References

External links
AIR 107.2 FM website

Radio stations in England
Radio stations in Dorset
Mass media in Dorset
Community radio stations in the United Kingdom
Weymouth and Portland
Radio stations established in 2011